José Miguel Real Teixeira (born 10 September 1973) is a retired Portuguese football defender and current manager.

References

1973 births
Living people
Footballers from Porto
Portuguese footballers
S.C. Olhanense players
S.C. Salgueiros players
F.C. Felgueiras players
C.F. União players
C.D.R. Quarteirense players
Association football defenders
Primeira Liga players